A totem is a symbol or a spirit that represents and watches over a group of people.

Totem may also refer to:

Arts, entertainment and media
 Totem (Cirque du Soleil), a show premiering in Montréal in May 2010
 Totem (film), a 2017 American supernatural horror film 
 Totem, an object that allows the user to distinguish dreams from reality in the 2010 film Inception
 Totems (video game), a video game for the Xbox 360 and PC
 The Totem, a 1979 novel by David Morrell

Music
 Tótem, an Uruguayan band formed in the early 1970s
 "Totem", a song on the 1996 Rush album Test for Echo

Albums
 Totem (Nazxul album), 1995
 Totem (Zazie album), 2007
 Totem (Satyr album), 2022
 Totem (Soulfly album)
Totem, a series of albums by Italian rapper En?gma
 Totem – Episodio uno, the first part
 Totem – Episodio due, the second part
 Totem – Episodio tre, the third part
 Totem – Episodio quattro, the fourth part

Sculptures
 Totem (Paluzzi), a sculpture by artist Rinaldo Paluzzi
 Totem pole, a monumental sculpture carved from trees

Science and technology
 Totem (software), a free software media player for the GNOME computer desktop environment
 TOTEM experiment, an experiment at the CERN Large Hadron Collider
 Totem pole output, a kind of electronic circuit

Other uses
 Aerodyne Totem Bi, a French two-place paraglider design
 Operation Totem, a pair of British atmospheric nuclear tests in Australia
 Tote'm Stores, the original name of 7-Eleven convenience stores

See also
 Totem pole (disambiguation)